Engine City may refer to:

Engine City (comics), a fictional city in DC Comics
Engine City (novel), a 2002 novel by Ken MacLeod